The Kibiti lampeye (Lacustricola lacustris) is a species of fish in the family Poeciliidae. It is endemic to Tanzania.  Its natural habitats are rivers and intermittent rivers.

Sources

Kibiti lampeye
Endemic freshwater fish of Tanzania
Kibiti lampeye
Kibiti lampeye
Taxonomy articles created by Polbot
Taxobox binomials not recognized by IUCN